Consumer Reports (CR), formerly Consumers Union (CU), is an American nonprofit consumer organization dedicated to independent product testing, investigative journalism, consumer-oriented research, public education, and consumer advocacy.

Founded in 1936, CR was created to serve as a source of information that consumers could use to help assess the safety and performance of products. Since that time, CR has continued its testing and analysis of products and services, and attempted to advocate for the consumer in legislative and rule-making areas. Among the reforms in which CR played a role were the advent of seat belt laws, exposure of the dangers of cigarettes, and more recently,  the enhancement of consumer finance protection and the increase of consumer access to quality health care. The organization has also expanded its reach to a suite of digital platforms. Consumer Reports Advocacy frequently supports environmental causes, including heightened regulations on auto manufacturers.

The organization's headquarters, including its 50 testing labs, are located in Yonkers, New York, while its automotive testing track is in East Haddam, Connecticut. CR is funded by subscriptions to its magazine and website, as well as through independent grants and donations. Marta L. Tellado is the current CEO of Consumer Reports. She joined the organization in 2014, following her work with the Ford Foundation, with the goal of expanding its engagement and advocacy efforts.

Consumer Reports' flagship website and magazine publishes reviews and comparisons of consumer products and services based on reporting and results from its in-house testing laboratory and survey research center. CR accepts no advertising, pays for all the products it tests, and as a nonprofit organization has no shareholders. It also publishes general and targeted product/service buying guides.

Advocacy and campaigns 

Consumer Reports has hundreds of thousands of online advocates who take action and write letters to policymakers about the issues its advocates take on. This group continues to grow as Consumer Reports expands its reach, with 6 million paid members who have access to online tools like a car recall tracker and personalized content. An additional base of online members join for free and received guidance on a range of products (i.e. gas grills, washing machines) at no charge. CR has also launched several advocacy websites, including HearUsNow.org, which helps consumers with telecommunications policy matters.  In March 2005, CR campaign PrescriptionforChange.org released "Drugs I Need", an animated short with a song from the Austin Lounge Lizards, that was featured by The New York Times, JibJab, BoingBoing, and hundreds of blogs. On Earth Day 2005, CR launched GreenerChoices.org, a web-based initiative meant to "inform, engage, and empower consumers about environmentally friendly products and practices."

Consumer Reports was a sponsor of the Safe Patient Project, whose goal was to help consumers find the best quality of health care by promoting the public disclosure of hospital-acquired infection rates and medical errors. The US Centers for Disease Control states that about 2 million patients annually (about 1 in 20) will acquire an infection while being treated in a hospital for an unrelated health care problem, resulting in 99,000 deaths and as much as $45 billion in excess hospital costs.

The campaign has worked in every state calling for legislation requiring hospitals to disclose infection rates to the public. The Safe Patient Project also works on medical devices, prescription drugs, and physician accountability.

GreenerChoices.org offers an "accessible, reliable, and practical source of information on buying 'greener' products that have minimal environmental impact and meet personal needs." The site contains many articles about different products, rating them on how "green" they are. It also focuses on electronics and appliance recycling and reuse, as well as conservation and global warming prevention.

Funding for Consumer Reports has recently been provided by USPIRG Education Fund, the Kentucky Equal Justice Center and the California Pan-Ethnic Health Network among other advocacy organizations.

In recent years, the organization has been vocal on key issues, including championing consumer choice and industry competition in the debate against the Sprint T-Mobile merger, advocating for consumer preference to leave net neutrality protections in place, exposing how data is used to engage in racial discrimination when determining consumer pricing offers, and advocating for stronger privacy laws in the wake of Cambridge Analytica.

Editorial independence
Consumer Reports is well known for its policies on editorial independence, which it says are to "maintain our independence and impartiality ... [so that] CR has no agenda other than the interests of consumers". CR has unusually strict requirements and sometimes has taken extraordinary steps; for example it declined to renew a car dealership's bulk subscription because of "the appearance of an impropriety".

Consumer Reports does not allow outside advertising in the magazine, but its website has retailers' advertisements. Consumer Reports states that PriceGrabber places the ads and pays a percentage of referral fees to CR, who has no direct relationship with the retailers. Consumer Reports publishes reviews of its business partner and recommends it in at least one case. CR had a similar relationship with BizRate at one time and has had relationships with other companies including Amazon.com, Yahoo!,  The Wall Street Journal, The Washington Post, BillShrink, and Decide.com. CR also accepts grants from other organizations.

Consumer Reports says its secret shoppers purchase all tested products at retail prices on behalf of the organization, that they do so anonymously, and that CR accepts no free samples in order to limit bias from bribery and to prevent being given better than average samples. Consumer Reports pays a rental fee to manufacturers when using these press samples and does not include the products in its ratings. For most of CRs history, it minimized contact with government and industry experts "to avoid compromising the independence of its judgment". In 2007, in response to errors in infant car seat testing, it began accepting advice from a wide range of experts on designing tests, but not on final assessments. Also, at times CR allows manufacturers to review and respond to criticism before publication. CR also accepts referral fees from websites such as Amazon for including “affiliate links” to websites where customers can purchase reviewed products.

Some objective and comparative tests published by Consumer Reports are carried out under the umbrella of the international consumer organization International Consumer Research & Testing. Consumer Reports also uses outside labs for testing, including for 11 percent of tests in 2006.

Publications

ConsumerReports.org, the website of Consumer Reports, is largely available only to paid subscribers.  ConsumerReports.org provides updates on product availability, and adds new products to previously-published test results.  In addition, the online data includes coverage that is not published in the magazine; for example, vehicle reliability (frequency of repair) tables online extend over the full 10 model years reported in the Annual Questionnaires, whereas the magazine has only a six-year history of each model.

In 1990, Consumer Reports launched Consumer Reports Television. By March 2005 it was "hosted" by over 100 stations.

On August 1, 2006 Consumer Reports launched ShopSmart, a magazine aimed at young women.

In 2008, Consumer Reports acquired The Consumerist blog from Gawker Media.

Magazine copies distributed in Canada include a small four-page supplement called "Canada Extra", explaining how the magazine's findings apply to that country and lists the examined items available there.

In 1998, Consumer Reports launched the grant-funded project Consumer Reports WebWatch, which aimed to improve the credibility of Web sites through investigative reporting, publicizing best-practices standards, and publishing a list of sites that comply with the standards. WebWatch worked with the Stanford Web Credibility Project, Harvard University's Berkman Center, The Annenberg School of Communications at the University of Pennsylvania, and others. WebWatch is a member of ICANN, the W3C and the Internet Society. Its content is free. As of July 31, 2009, WebWatch has been shut down, though the site is still available.

Consumer Reports Best Buy Drugs is available free on Consumer Reports Health.org. It compares prescription drugs in over 20 major categories, such as heart disease, blood pressure and diabetes, and gives comparative ratings of effectiveness and costs, in reports and tables, in web pages and PDF documents, in summary and detailed form.

Also in 2005 Consumer Reports launched the service Greener Choices, which is meant to "inform, engage, and empower consumers about environmentally-friendly products and practices". It contains information about conservation, electronics recycling and conservation with the goal or providing an "accessible, reliable, and practical source of information on buying "greener" products that have minimal environmental impact and meet personal needs".

Consumer Reports published a kids' version of Consumer Reports called Penny Power, later changed to Zillions.  This publication was similar to Consumer Reports but served a younger audience.  At its peak, the magazine covered close to 350,000 subscribers. It gave children financial advice for budgeting their allowances and saving for a big purchase, reviewed kid-oriented consumer products (e.g., toys, clothes, electronics, food, videogames, etc.), and generally promoted smart consumerism in kids and teens; testing of products came from kids of the age range a product was targeted toward. It also taught kids about deceitful marketing practices practiced by advertising agencies. The magazine folded in 2000.

Consumer Reports had an annual testing budget of approximately US$25 million, as well as approximately 7 million subscribers (3.8 million print and 3.2 million digital) as of April 2016.

The organization had around 6 million members in July 2018.

History 

Consumer Reports' predecessor, Consumers' Research, was founded in 1926. In 1936, Consumer Reports was founded by Arthur Kallet, Colston Warne, and others who felt that the established Consumers' Research organization was not aggressive enough.  Kallet, an engineer and director of Consumers' Research, had a falling out with F.J. Schlink and started his own organization with Amherst College economics professor Colston Warne. In part due to actions of Consumers' Research, the House Un-American Activities Committee placed Consumers Union on a list of subversive organizations, only to remove it in 1954.

Prominent consumer advocate Ralph Nader was on the board of directors, but left in 1975 due to a "division of philosophy" with new Executive Director Rhoda Karpatkin. Nader wanted Consumer Reports to focus on policy and product advocacy, while Karpatkin focused on product testing.  Karpatkin was appointed executive director in 1974 and retired as president in the early 2000s.

Consumer Reports has helped start several consumer groups and publications, in 1960 helping create global consumer group Consumers International and in 1974 providing financial assistance to Consumers' Checkbook which is considered akin to Consumer Reports for local services in the seven metropolitan areas they serve.

At the start of 2009, Consumer Reports acquired The Consumerist blog from Gawker Media for approximately $600,000.

Prior to 2012, the organization did business as Consumers Union. The reason for the name change was that the name of  "Consumer Reports" was more familiar to the public than the name of "Consumers Union".

Consumer Reports spent $200,000 on lobbying in 2015.

The Consumerist was subsequently closed in December 2017, when its content was folded into the Consumer Reports website.

Product changes after Consumer Reports tests 

In the July 1978 issue, Consumer Reports rated the Dodge Omni/Plymouth Horizon automobile "not acceptable", the first car it had judged such since the AMC Ambassador in 1968. In its testing they found the possibility of these models' developing an oscillatory yaw as a result of a sudden violent input to the steering; the manufacturer claimed: "Some do, some don't" show this behavior, but it has no "validity in the real world of driving". Nevertheless, the next year, these models included a lighter weight steering wheel rim and a steering damper, and Consumer Reports reported that the previous instability was no longer present.

In a 2003 issue of CR, the magazine tested the Nissan Murano crossover utility vehicle and did not recommend the vehicle because of a problem with its power steering, even though the vehicle had above-average reliability. The specific problem was that the steering would stiffen substantially on hard turning. CR recommended the 2005 model, which had addressed this problem.

BMW changed the software for the stability control in its X5 SUV after replicating a potential rollover problem discovered during a CR test.

In 2010, CR rated the 2010 Lexus GX 460 SUV unsafe after the vehicle failed one of the magazine's emergency safety tests. Toyota temporarily suspended sales of the vehicle, and after conducting its own test acknowledged the problem and issued a recall for the vehicle, which later passed a CR re-test.

In 2016, CR found wildly inconsistent battery life in its testing of Apple's 2016 MacBook Pro. This led to the discovery of a bug in the Safari web browser, which Apple promptly fixed via a software update.

In May 2018, CR said it could not recommend the Tesla Model 3 due to concerns about the car's long stopping distance. Within days, Tesla issued a remote software update. CR retested the car's brakes, then gave the Model 3 a "recommended" rating.

Lawsuits against Consumer Reports
Consumer Reports has been sued several times by companies unhappy with reviews of their products. Consumer Reports has fought these cases vigorously. As of October 2000, Consumer Reports had been sued by 13 manufacturers and never lost a case.

Bose
In 1971, Bose Corporation sued Consumer Reports (CR) for libel after CR reported in a review that the sound from the system it reviewed "tended to wander about the room".  The case eventually reached the United States Supreme Court, which affirmed in Bose Corp. v. Consumers Union of United States, Inc. that CR statement was made without actual malice and therefore was not libelous.

Suzuki

In 1988, Consumer Reports announced during a press conference that the Suzuki Samurai had demonstrated a tendency to roll and deemed it "not acceptable".  Suzuki sued in 1996 after the Samurai was again mentioned in a CR anniversary issue.  In July 2004, after eight years in court, the suit was settled and dismissed with no money changing hands and no retraction issued, but Consumers Union did agree to no longer refer to the 16-year-old test results of the 1988 Samurai in its advertising or promotional materials.

Rivera Isuzu
In December 1997, the Isuzu Trooper distributor in Puerto Rico sued CR, alleging that it had lost sales as a result of disparagement of the Trooper by the Consumers Union of the United States (CU).  A trial court granted the motion for summary judgment by the CU, and the U.S. Court of Appeals for the First Circuit affirmed the favorable judgment.

Sharper Image
In 2003, Sharper Image sued CR in California for product disparagement over negative reviews of its Ionic Breeze Quadra air purifier. CR moved for dismissal on October 31, 2003, and the case was dismissed in November 2004.  The decision also awarded CR $525,000 in legal fees and costs.

Controversy over child safety seats
The February 2007 issue of Consumer Reports stated that only two of the child safety seats it tested for that issue passed the organization's side impact tests.  The National Highway Traffic Safety Administration, which subsequently retested the seats, found that all those seats passed the corresponding NHTSA tests at the speeds described in the magazine report.  The CR article reported that the tests simulated the effects of collisions at 38.5 mph.  However, the tests that were completed in fact simulated collisions at 70 mph. CR stated in a letter from its president Jim Guest to its subscribers that it would retest the seats. The article was removed from the CR website, and on January 18, 2007, the organization posted a note on its home page about the misleading tests.  Subscribers were also sent a postcard apologizing for the error.

On January 28, 2007, The New York Times published an op-ed from Joan Claybrook, who served on the board of CR from 1982 to 2006 (and was the head of the National Highway Traffic Safety Administration from 1977 to 1981), where she discussed the sequence of events leading to the publishing of the erroneous information.

Other errors or issues
In February 1998, the organization tested pet food and claimed that Iams dog food was nutritionally deficient.  It later retracted the report claiming that there had been "a systemic error in the measurements of various minerals we tested – potassium, calcium and magnesium".

In 2006, Consumer Reports said six hybrid vehicles would probably not save owners money. The organization later discovered that it had miscalculated depreciation and released an update stating that four of the seven vehicles would save the buyers money if the vehicles were kept for five years (and received the federal tax credit for hybrid vehicles, which expired after each manufacturer sold 60,000 hybrid vehicles).

Graphs 

Consumer Reports graphs formerly used a modified form of Harvey balls for qualitative comparison. The round ideograms were arranged from best to worst. On the left of the diagram, the red circle indicated the highest rating, the half red and white circle was the second highest rating, the white circle was neutral, the half black circle was the second-lowest rating, and the entirely black circle was the lowest rating possible.

As part of a wider rebranding of Consumer Reports in September 2016, the appearance of the magazine's rating system was significantly revamped. The Harvey balls were replaced with new color-coded circles: green for excellent; lime green for very good; yellow for good; orange for fair; and red for poor. It was stated that this new system will help improve the clarity of ratings tables by using a "universally understood" metaphor.

See also 
 Euroconsumers and ICRT International Consumer Research and Testing
 Good Housekeeping Institute
 Stiftung Warentest
 Underwriters Laboratories
 Which?
 Consumer protection
 Consumer education
Consumers International
Australian Consumers' Association
Consumers' Institute of New Zealand
UFC Que Choisir, France's most important consumers' group.

References

Works cited

External links 

 

Consumer magazines
Consumer guides
Consumer organizations in the United States
Advertising-free magazines
Monthly magazines published in the United States
Magazines established in 1936
1936 establishments in the United States
Magazines published in New York (state)
 
Articles containing video clips